The International Federation of Sleddog Sports (IFSS, International Federation of Sleddog Sports) is the global governing/sanctioning body of sleddog sports. It represents 49 national sleddog sport federations and organizations that are overseen by the board and six continental directors.

There are three sleddog sport categories that IFSS covers: Dryland, Skidogs, Sleds, what are run in 2 separate World championships on Snow and off Snow (dryland). IFSS also organizes IFSS/WSA Long Distance World Championships and is involved in many non-racing activities that promote the sport, its safety, animal wealthfare.

Sleddog sports categories
Dryland events include:
 Canicross
 Bikejoring
 1-2 dog scooters
 4-6-8 dog wheel rigs

Skidog events include:
 1-2 dog Skijoring
 Pulka

Sled classes:
 2-4-6-8-10&unlimited sleddog sprint
 6 and 12 sleddog middle distances
 8 and unlimited sleddog long distances

History
International Federation of Sleddog Sports was officially incorporated in 1992 as a way to focus the efforts of many national, local and international organizations on the goal of Olympic recognition and alignment of mushing with other mainstream sports through the General Association of International Sports Federations. IFSS is recognized by GAISF and in all countries as the world governing body of sled dog sports.
2013 saw the headquarters relocated from USA to Europe, Beligium.

See also

References

External links
 

Sledding
Dog sledding